Robert Minor Wallace (August 6, 1856 – November 9, 1942) was a U.S. Representative from Arkansas.

Born in New London, Arkansas, Wallace attended the common schools, and was graduated from Arizona Seminary, Arizona, Louisiana, in 1876.
He studied law.
He was admitted to the bar at Little Rock, Arkansas, in 1879 and commenced the practice of law in El Dorado, Arkansas.
He served as member of the State house of representatives in 1881 and 1882.
United States post office inspector 1887-1891.
He served as prosecuting attorney for the thirteenth judicial circuit of Arkansas in 1891 and 1892.
He served as assistant United States attorney in 1894.

Wallace was elected as a Democrat to the Fifty-eighth and to the three succeeding Congresses (March 4, 1903 – March 3, 1911).
He was an unsuccessful candidate for renomination in 1910 to the Sixty-second Congress.
He resumed the practice of his profession at Hot Springs and Little Rock and also engaged in lecturing for the Chautauqua and for the Anti-Saloon League.
He moved to Magnolia, Arkansas, where he died on November 9, 1942.
He was interred in Magnolia Cemetery.

References

1856 births
1942 deaths
Democratic Party members of the Arkansas House of Representatives
Democratic Party members of the United States House of Representatives from Arkansas